Beaver cloth is a heavy woolen cloth with a napped surface. Beaver is a double cloth; it resembles felted beaver-fur and is suitable for outer  garments such as coats and hats. The fabric was formerly made in England.

Castor 
Castor was a cloth lighter than beaver cloth, but otherwise similar. It was produced by using fine wool. Castor was used in overcoating.

See also 
 Swansdown
 Nap (fabric)
 Gig-mill

References 

Woven fabrics
Waulked textiles